Eudonia franciscalis is a moth in the family Crambidae. It was described by Eugene G. Munroe in 1972. It is found in North America, where it has been recorded from California.

References

Moths described in 1972
Eudonia